The New Zealand Tertiary Education Union (in Māori: Te Hautū Kahurangi o Aotearoa) is the main trade union in the New Zealand tertiary education sector, and represents the interests of more than 10,000 workers employed within the sector across New Zealand. Its membership includes academics, researchers, teachers and workers employed in all occupations in universities, polytechnics, institutes of technology, wānanga, other tertiary education providers and allied organisations.

History

Founded in 2009, the TEU was established a result of the amalgamation of the Association of University Staff of New Zealand (AUS) and the Association of Staff in Tertiary Education (ASTE). The Tertiary Institutions Allied Staff Association (TIASA) voted not to amalgamate  and remain independent.

TEU is a registered trade union in accordance with the Employment Relations Act 2000. The TEU is a democratic union with strong membership participation and is governed by an elected council. Policy is determined by an annual conference and implemented by a number of committees.

Campaigns

As well as negotiating typical labour rights and employment issues with employers (salary levels, hours of work, etc) the TEU has been involved in a number of national campaigns.

Paid parental leave 
The Union have actively supported longer statutory paid parental leave, including the recent Parental Leave and Employment Protection (Six Months’ Paid Leave and Work Contact Hours) Amendment Bill which provides six months paid parental leave and guaranteed right to return to work afterwards. The bill is currently stalled in parliament.

Academic Freedom 

The Union have campaigned for academic freedom, running an essay competition in cooperation with Academic Freedom Aotearoa. and giving out awards, including to Mike Joy an academic at Massey University who had a high profile clash with Prime Minister John Key.

Living Wage 

Under the Employment Relations Act 2000 there are limits on what actions a union can take in support of employment relations involving employees other than union members, but the TEU supports the Living Wage Movement Aotearoa NZ which campaigns to raise the legal minimum wage. A number of the TEU's members are paid the current legal minimum wage.

Membership 

The Union is present in most tertiary education institutions representing academic, purely teaching, purely research and general staff.

The Union is the members' official representative in employment matters when dealing with their employers (directly or indirectly), many union members  (particularly academics and researchers) are also members of the Royal Society of New Zealand (commonly via constituent bodies) as it is the peak professional body in the humanities and the sciences and has legislated roles in science and research funding.

International

Through membership of Education International, TEU is linked to international education groups worldwide, and a wide range of education unions and through membership of the New Zealand Council of Trade Unions, TEU works with other unions to improve the position of all New Zealand workers.

References

External links

New Zealand Council of Trade Unions
Trade unions in New Zealand
Higher education in New Zealand
Trade unions established in 2009